Northern Irish actor Jamie Dornan initially began his career as a model. He made his screen debut in 2006 with Sofia Coppola's drama film Marie Antoinette playing Count Axel Fersen. As he still continued modelling in that decade, he had infrequent appearances in independent and short films mostly with small roles. He drew wider public attention with his appearance in ABC television series Once Upon a Time (2011). Playing a serial killer Paul Spector, also a bereavement counsellor, in BBC crime drama The Fall (2013-2016), brought him his breakthrough and critical acclaim. For his performance in The Fall, Dornan received his first Irish Film and Television Award for best actor and was nominated for a British Academy Television Award for Best Actor.

His stardom followed further as in 2013, he was cast as Christian Grey in the film adaptation of the novel Fifty Shades of Grey. He later reprised the same role in Fifty Shades Darker and Fifty Shades Freed. Despite being critically derided, the franchise became a commercial success as it earned approximately $1.32 billion. After the Fifty Shades franchise, he appeared in war films Anthropoid and The Siege of Jadotville, both in 2016. For his supporting turn as Jan Kubiš in the former film, he was nominated for Czech Lion Award for Best Supporting Actor. He later appeared in comedy films Wild Mountain Thyme (2020) and Barb and Star Go to Vista Del Mar (2021).

Dornan gained reputation with Kenneth Branagh's semi-biographical drama film Belfast, in 2021. He co-starred alongside Ciaran Hinds, Judi Dench and Caitriona Balfe, as a working class father who was trying to protect his family during The Troubles. His performance earned him a nomination for Golden Globe Award for Best Supporting Actor – Motion Picture. The film was nominated for Best Picture at the 94th Academy Awards.

Dornan was also the lead singer in the folk band Sons of Jim until it disbanded in 2008.

Film

Television

Discography

As singer

As narrator

Selected modelling campaigns

See also
List of awards and nominations received by Jamie Dornan

Notes

References

Male actor filmographies